Hector McFie (3 October 1898 – 23 May 1982) was an Australian politician. He was born in Devonport, Tasmania and held a Diploma of Mechanical Engineering. In 1954 he was elected to the Tasmanian Legislative Council as the Independent member for Mersey. He served as Chair of Committees from 1968 to 1971 and President of the Council from 12 October 1971 to 25 May 1972, when he retired from politics.

References

1898 births
1982 deaths
Independent members of the Parliament of Tasmania
Members of the Tasmanian Legislative Council
Presidents of the Tasmanian Legislative Council
People from Devonport, Tasmania
20th-century Australian politicians